Enteromius inaequalis is a species of ray-finned fish in the genus Enteromius.

References

 

Enteromius
Taxa named by Christian Lévêque
Taxa named by Guy G. Teugels
Taxa named by Thys van den Audenaerde
Fish described in 1988